The 12909 / 12910 Bandra Terminus–Hazrat Nizamuddin Garib Rath Express is a Express train of the Garib Rath category belonging to Indian Railways – Western Railway zone that runs between Bandra Terminus and  in India.

It operates as train number 12909 from Bandra Terminus to Hazrat Nizamuddin and as train number 12910 in the reverse direction, serving the states of Maharashtra, Gujarat, Madhya Pradesh, Rajasthan & Delhi.

Coaches

The 12909 / 10 Bandra Terminus–Hazrat Nizamuddin Garib Rath Express presently has 15 AC 3 tier & 4 AC Chair Car coaches. There is 1 EOG each at both the ends.

Service

12909 Bandra Terminus–Hazrat Nizamuddin Garib Rath Express covers the distance of 1367 kilometres in 17 hours 05 mins (81.15 km/hr) & in 16 hours 35 mins as 12910 Hazrat Nizamuddin–Bandra Terminus Garib Rath Express (82.79 km/hr) making it the 2nd fastest train on the Mumbai–Delhi sector, but fastest Garib Rath in India.
 
As the average speed of the train is above 55 km/hr, as per Indian Railways rules, its fare includes a Superfast surcharge.

Route & Halts

The important halts of the train are:

Traction

Prior to February 2012, Dual traction WCAM-2/2P locos would haul the train between Bandra Terminus &  after which a Vadodara-based WAP-5 locomotive would take over until Hazrat Nizamuddin.

Western Railway completed DC electric conversion to AC on 5 February 2012 & it is now regularly hauled by a Ghaziabad or Vadodara-based WAP-5 or WAP-7 locomotive for its entire journey.

Timings

12909  Bandra Terminus–Hazrat Nizamuddin Garib Rath Express leaves Bandra Terminus every Tuesday, Thursday & Saturday at 16:35 PM IST and reaches Hazrat Nizamuddin at 09:40 AM IST the next day.

The 12910 Hazrat Nizamuddin–Bandra Terminus Garib Rath Express leaves Hazrat Nizamuddin every Wednesday, Friday & Sunday at 15:35 PM IST and reaches Bandra Terminus at 08:10 AM IST the next day.

Gallery

References

External links

Sister trains
 August Kranti Rajdhani Express
 Bandra Terminus–Hazrat Nizamuddin AC Superfast Express
 Bandra Terminus–Hazrat Nizamuddin Yuva Express
 Delhi Sarai Rohilla–Bandra Terminus Garib Rath Express
 Lokmanya Tilak Terminus–Hazrat Nizamuddin AC Express
 Maharashtra Sampark Kranti Express
 Mumbai–New Delhi Duronto Express
 Mumbai Rajdhani Express
 Mumbai CSMT–Hazrat Nizamuddin Rajdhani Express

Delhi–Mumbai trains
Railway services introduced in 2007
Garib Rath Express trains
Rail transport in Gujarat
Rail transport in Madhya Pradesh
Rail transport in Rajasthan
Rail transport in Haryana